Todor "Toza" Veselinović (22 October 1930 – 17 May 2017) was a Serbian footballer and coach. He was one of the most renowned goalscorers in Yugoslavian history. Veselinović was the last surviving member of Yugoslavia's 1954 World Cup squad. He also won a silver medal at the 1956 Summer Olympics.

Career

Playing career
At international level, he won 37 caps and scored 28 goals. He played in the 1954 FIFA World Cup and 1958 FIFA World Cup, scoring three goals in the latter tournament. He played for several clubs in his homeland and abroad. He established himself as one of the best strikers in former Yugoslavia. He was the Yugoslav First League top scorer on four occasions. In total for Vojvodina, he scored 586 goals, including unofficial games.

Coaching career
He later began a coaching career and managed several clubs, including Independiente Santa Fe in Colombia, Olympiacos in Greece, and Fenerbahçe in Turkey. He won two Turkish league titles (1985 and 1989) with Fenerbahçe.

He also managed Yugoslavia at the finals of Euro 84 in France, where they lost all three of their games. Veselinović's time as Yugoslav manager was characterized by continuous tinkering and changing of his team selection. In two seasons at the helm, he used almost 60 players.

References

External links

Todor Veselinović at mackolik.com 

1930 births
2017 deaths
Footballers from Novi Sad
Serbian footballers
Yugoslav footballers
Association football forwards
FK Vojvodina players
FK Partizan players
FK Proleter Zrenjanin players
U.C. Sampdoria players
First Vienna FC players
Royale Union Saint-Gilloise players
FC Kärnten players
Yugoslav First League players
Serie A players
Austrian Football Bundesliga players
Belgian Pro League players
Yugoslavia international footballers
1954 FIFA World Cup players
1958 FIFA World Cup players
Footballers at the 1956 Summer Olympics
Olympic footballers of Yugoslavia
Olympic silver medalists for Yugoslavia
Medalists at the 1956 Summer Olympics
Olympic medalists in football
Yugoslav expatriate footballers
Yugoslav expatriate sportspeople in Italy
Yugoslav expatriate sportspeople in Austria
Yugoslav expatriate sportspeople in Belgium
Expatriate footballers in Italy
Expatriate footballers in Austria
Expatriate footballers in Belgium
Yugoslav football managers
Serbian football managers
FC Kärnten managers
Independiente Santa Fe managers
Colombia national football team managers
C.D. El Nacional managers
FK Vojvodina managers
Olympiacos F.C. managers
Levante UD managers
Millonarios F.C. managers
Yugoslavia national football team managers
Fenerbahçe football managers
Apollon Smyrnis F.C. managers
U.S. Catanzaro 1929 managers
Diagoras F.C. managers
AEK Athens F.C. managers
Gaziantepspor managers
Bakırköyspor managers
Karşıyaka S.K. managers
Ethnikos Piraeus F.C. managers
Austrian Football Bundesliga managers
Yugoslav First League managers
Super League Greece managers
Segunda División managers
Süper Lig managers
Serie B managers
UEFA Euro 1984 managers
Yugoslav expatriate football managers
Yugoslav expatriate sportspeople in Colombia
Yugoslav expatriate sportspeople in Ecuador
Yugoslav expatriate sportspeople in Spain
Yugoslav expatriate sportspeople in Turkey
Yugoslav expatriate sportspeople in Greece
Serbian expatriate football managers
Serbian expatriate sportspeople in Greece
Serbian expatriate sportspeople in Turkey
Expatriate football managers in Austria
Expatriate football managers in Colombia
Expatriate football managers in Ecuador
Expatriate football managers in Spain
Expatriate football managers in Turkey
Expatriate football managers in Greece
Expatriate football managers in Italy